Philenora latifasciata is a moth in the subfamily Arctiinae. It was described by Inoue and Kobayashi in 1963. It is found in Japan and Taiwan.

References

Natural History Museum Lepidoptera generic names catalog

Moths described in 1963
Lithosiini